WEEP (1400 AM) is a radio station formerly licensed to serve Virginia, Minnesota.  The FCC license, most recently held by Full Armor Ministries, Inc., expired on August 1, 2005. The station last aired a Religious radio format. The station began broadcasting in 1936, with a power of 250 watts. It was the ninth oldest station in Minnesota.

The station was purchased in 1951 by Frank P. Befera, a pioneer in Minnesota broadcasting. The station remained in the Befera family (dba Virginia Broadcasting Company) until it was sold to Full Armor Ministries of Eveleth, Minnesota, for a reported sale price of $52,000. The deal closed on October 1, 2000, gained FCC approval on February 13, 2001, and transfer was consummated on April 1, 2001.

The station was assigned the WEEP call letters by the Federal Communications Commission on March 7, 2001. The call letters were deleted from the FCC database on June 27, 2006, although the station is officially listed as "licensed and silent."

The station has been silent since a transmitter failure in December 2002. The tower, lacking basic maintenance, was described as "rusting away" during an August 2005 visit by radio journalist Scott Fybush.

Efforts to sell the station to the city of Virginia were complicated and ultimately thwarted by licensee Full Armor Ministries' failure to file a timely license renewal. In January 2008, the FCC denied a petition for reconsideration from the (now former) licensee and the city.

In 2008, the City of Virginia gave permission to a local firm to dismantle the former studio building and radio tower.  The building was moved and the tower taken down.  Today, only a small grove of trees marks the area where the radio station was located.  The city is hoping that the site will eventually be used for future economic endeavors.

References

External links
 Query the FCC's AM station database for WEEP

Defunct religious radio stations in the United States
Radio stations in Minnesota
Defunct radio stations in the United States
St. Louis County, Minnesota
Radio stations disestablished in 2006
2006 disestablishments in Minnesota
Radio stations established in 1936
1936 establishments in Minnesota
Defunct mass media in Minnesota